Osarseph  or Osarsiph  is a legendary figure of Ancient Egypt who has been equated with Moses. His story was recounted by the Ptolemaic Egyptian historian Manetho in his Aegyptiaca (first half of the 3rd century BC); Manetho's work is lost, but the 1st century AD Jewish historian Josephus quotes extensively from it.

The story depicts Osarseph as a renegade Egyptian priest who leads an army of lepers and other unclean people against a pharaoh named Amenophis. The pharaoh is driven out of the country and the leper-army, in alliance with the Hyksos (whose story is also told by Manetho) ravage Egypt, committing many sacrileges against the gods, before Amenophis returns and expels them. Towards the end of the story Osarseph changes his name to Moses.

Much debated is the question of what, if any, historical reality might lie behind the Osarseph story. The story has been linked with anti-Jewish propaganda of the second and first centuries BCE as an inversion of the Exodus story, but an influential study by Egyptologist Jan Assmann has suggested that no single historical incident or person lies behind the legend, and that it represents instead a conflation of several historical traumas, notably the religious reforms of Akhenaten (Amenophis IV).

Story
The story of Osarseph is known from two long quotations from the Aegyptiaca, a history of Egypt by the Egyptian historian Manetho, in Josephus's Against Apion. The first is Manetho's account of the expulsion of the Hyksos (the name is given by Manetho) and their settlement in Judea, where they found the city of Jerusalem. Josephus then draws the conclusion that Manetho's Hyksos were the Jews of the Exodus, although Manetho himself makes no such connection.

The second, set some two hundred years later, tells the story of Osarseph. According to Josephus, Manetho described Osarseph as a tyrannical high priest of Osiris at Heliopolis. Pharaoh Amenophis had a desire to see the gods, but in order to do so he first had to cleanse Egypt of lepers and other polluted people, setting 80,000 of them to work in the stone quarries, and then confining them to Avaris, the former Hyksos capital in the Eastern Delta. There Osarseph became their leader and ordered them to give up the worship of the gods and eat the meat of the holy animals. The Osarsephites then invited the Hyksos back into Egypt, and together with their new allies drove Amenophis and his son Ramses into exile in Nubia and instituted a 13-year reign of religious oppression: towns and temples were devastated, the images of the gods destroyed, the sanctuaries turned into kitchens and the sacred animals roasted over fires, until eventually Amenophis and Rameses returned to expel the lepers and the Hyksos and restore the old Egyptian religion. Towards the end of the story Manetho reports that Osarseph took the name "Moses".

Interpretations
Three interpretations have been proposed for the story: the first, as a memory of the Amarna period; the second, as a memory of the Hyksos; and the third, as anti-Jewish propaganda. Each explanation has evidence to support it: the name of the pharaoh, Amenophis, and the religious character of the conflict fit the Amarna reform of Egyptian religion; the name of Avaris and possibly the name Osarseph fit the Hyksos period, and the overall plot is an apparent inversion of the Jewish story of the Exodus casting the Jews in a bad light. No one theory, however, can explain all the elements. An influential proposition by Egyptologist Jan Assmann suggests that the story has no single origin but rather combines numerous historical experiences, notably the Amarna and Hyksos periods, into a folk memory. 

An alternative theory identifies Osarseph with the historical figure of Chancellor Bay, a prominent Syrian officer who rose to power during the reign of Pharaoh Seti II and later attempted to usurp the throne, only to be arrested and executed by order of Pharaoh Siptah. However, such identification is usually rejected by scholars.

Israel Knohl recently proposed to identify Osarseph with Irsu, a Shasu who, according to Papyrus Harris I and the Elephantine Stele, took power in Egypt with the support of "Asiatics" (people from the Levant) after the death of Queen Twosret; after coming to power, Irsu and his supporters disrupted Egyptian rituals, "treating the gods like the people" and halting offerings to the Egyptian deities. They were eventually defeated and expelled by the new Pharaoh Setnakhte and, while fleeing, they abandoned large quantities of gold and silver they had stolen from the temples.

It is possible that the Osarseph story, or at least the point at which Osarseph changes his name to Moses, is an alteration to Manetho's original history made in the 1st century BC when anti-Jewish sentiment was running high in Egypt, since without this Manetho's history has no mention of the Jews at all. If the story is an original part of Manetho's history of Egypt, the question arises of where he could have heard it, as the Greek Septuagint translation of the Hebrew Torah (i.e., the Exodus narrative) had not been made when he was writing. It is possible that he had an oral (Jewish) informant, or possibly an otherwise unknown pre-Septuagint translation.

See also
Joseph and His Brothers
Moses and Monotheism by Sigmund Freud

References

Ancient Egyptian priests
Moses